The 1997 NCAA Division I Cross Country Championships were the 59th annual NCAA Men's Division I Cross Country Championship and the 17th annual NCAA Women's Division I Cross Country Championship to determine the team and individual national champions of NCAA Division I men's and women's collegiate cross country running in the United States. In all, four different titles were contested: men's and women's individual and team championships.

Held on November 24, 1997, the combined meet was hosted by Furman University in Greenville, South Carolina. The distance for the men's race was 10 kilometers (6.21 miles) while the distance for the women's race was 5 kilometers (3.11 miles). 

The men's team championship was again won by Stanford (53 points), the Cardinal's second overall and second consecutive. The women's team championship was won by BYU (100 points), the Cougars' first.

The two individual champions were, for the men, Meb Keflezighi (UCLA, 28:54) and, for the women, Carrie Tollefson (Villanova, 16:29).

Men's title
Distance: 10,000 meters

Men's Team Result (Top 10)

Men's Individual Result (Top 10)

Women's title
Distance: 5,000 meters

Women's Team Result (Top 10)

Women's Individual Result (Top 10)

References
 

NCAA Cross Country Championships
NCAA Division I Cross Country Championships
NCAA Division I Cross Country Championships
NCAA Division I Cross Country Championships
Track and field in South Carolina
Sports in Greenville, South Carolina
Furman University